Andrew Kingsford Mensah (born 26 November 1955) is a Ghanaian politician and member of the Fourth Parliament of the Fourth Republic of Ghana representing the Abura-Asebu-Kwamankese Constituency in the Central Region.

Early life and education 
Mensah was born in Abura-Asebu-Kwamankese in the Central Region of Ghana on 26 November 1955. He attended the University of Cape Coast and obtained a Degree in Masters of Arts( Education).

Career 
Mensah was a member of Parliament for the Abura-Asebu-Kwamankese Constituency from 2005 to 2009 in the Central Region of Ghana. He also is a District Chief Executive for the Abura-Asebu-Kwamankese District.

Politics 
Mensah was first elected into Parliament during the December 2004 Ghanaian General elections on the Ticket of the New Patriotic Party as a member of Parliament for the Abura-Asebu-Kwamankese Constituency in the Central Region when he won with 19,196 votes out of the 35,923 valid votes cast representing 53.40%.

Personal life 
Mensah is a Christian.

References 

1955 births
People from Central Region (Ghana)
Living people
University of Cape Coast alumni
Ghanaian Christians
21st-century Ghanaian politicians
New Patriotic Party politicians
Ghanaian MPs 2005–2009